The 1975 Volvo International was a men's tennis tournament played on outdoor clay courts in North Conway, New Hampshire, in the United States and was part of the 1975 Commercial Union Assurance Grand Prix. The tournament was held from August 4 though August 10, 1975, and first-seeded Jimmy Connors won the singles title.

Finals

Singles

 Jimmy Connors defeated  Ken Rosewall 6–2, 6–2
 It was Connors' 8th title of the year and the 49th of his career.

Doubles
 Haroon Rahim /  Erik van Dillen defeated  John Alexander /  Phil Dent 6–3, 1–6, 7–5
 It was Rahim's only title of the year and the 2nd of his career. It was Van Dillen's 3rd title of the year and the 8th of his career.

References

External links
 ITF tournament edition details

 
Volvo International
Volvo International
Volvo International
Volvo International